Hanson Park is a station on Metra's Milwaukee District West Line in the Hanson Park neighborhood of Chicago, Illinois. In Metra's zone-based fare system, Hanson Park is in zone B. As of 2018, Hanson Park is the 207th busiest of Metra's 236 non-downtown stations, with an average of 58 weekday boardings. Metra's North Central Service trains use these tracks but do not stop.

As of December 12, 2022, Hanson Park is served as a flag stop by 15 trains (nine inbound, six outbound) on weekdays only.

Parking for the station is available on both sides of Armitage Avenue between Major and Parkside Avenues. The station is sandwiched between Metra's main line and several holding tracks for freight trains bound for either Bensenville Yard or the Belt Railway of Chicago to the south of the
station. Chicago Public School football games are held at Hanson Stadium, which sits north of the station. There is a bridge to the east of the station that carries Central Ave (5600 W.) To the far west of the station is the former (now abandoned) television factory for Zenith Electronics. Before this station was built, the area around it was mostly a gigantic railroad yard for the Milwaukee Road until circa 1970's when it was demolished and moved to Bensenville yard. However, the Glidden grain elevator, located east of North Central Ave., remained on the former site until the 2000s when it was demolished to make way for a new shopping complex, residential dwellings and government buildings. In the 1960s, Zenith Electronics purchased a site of the Galewood Yards from the Milwaukee Road to build its new headquarters.

Bus connections
CTA
 65 Grand
 85 Central

References

External links 

Hanson Park Station Images (Chicago Railfan.net)
Station House from Google Maps Street View

Metra stations in Chicago
Former Chicago, Milwaukee, St. Paul and Pacific Railroad stations
Railway stations in the United States opened in 1976
1976 establishments in Illinois